Jerry W. Rees (born November 15, 1956) is an American film director and animator, best known for the Emmy-nominated animated film The Brave Little Toaster (1987) and creating many of the visual effects for the cult classic Tron (1982).

Early life
Rees was mentored as an animator from the age of 16 at Disney Studios, by one of Walt Disney's Nine Old Men, and was trained and taught at California Institute of the Arts, along with classmates John Lasseter, Brad Bird, John Musker, Tim Burton and Doug Lefler.

Career
In 1978, Rees worked as an animator for the Christmas children's film The Small One. He also worked on the Disney film The Fox and the Hound (1981), and the following year served as one of the visual effects supervisors for the cutting-edge science fiction film Tron.

In 1987, Rees and science fiction writer Thomas M. Disch collaborated on adapting Disch's short story The Brave Little Toaster into an animated film. The resulting film was nominated for a Grand Jury Prize at the Sundance Film Festival and nominated for Best Animated Program at the 1988 Emmy Awards. He also teamed up with fellow CalArts alum Tim Burton to co-write and co-direct the cult classic featurettes Doctor of Doom and Luau.

Rees directed the Neil Simon-penned The Marrying Man (1991) and served as an animation producer on the film Space Jam (1996). He directed the award-winning Back to Neverland documentary starring Robin Williams and Walter Cronkite, shown as part of the animation studio tours at Disneyland and Walt Disney World. He also directed the educational films Tourist from Hell and The Editing Story, which screened as part of the backstage tour at Disney's Hollywood Studios.

In 1993, Rees wrote and produced (with Steven Paul Leiva) a new Betty Boop feature film for Metro-Goldwyn-Mayer. Seventy-five percent of the film was storyboarded, but two weeks before voice recording was to begin, MGM switched studio chiefs and the project, tentatively called The Betty Boop Feature Script, was abandoned.

In addition to his film credits, Rees helped produce and direct a record-setting 13 multimedia features at the various Disney theme parks, including Sounds Dangerous at Disney-MGM Studios, the live-action sequences of Cranium Command at EPCOT, Indiana Jones Epic Stunt Spectacular! at Disney-MGM Studios, Rock 'n' Roller Coaster at Disney-MGM Studios and Walt Disney Studios Paris, Extra-Terrorestrial Alien Encounter at Magic Kingdom, Michael & Mickey at Disney-MGM Studios, and the new Cinemagique show at Walt Disney Studios Paris. Rees also directed the pre-ride film at Disney's Animal Kingdom ride Dinosaur.

For some time, Rees was attached as director to a project called Rand Robinson, Robot Repairman, financed by Interscope and Philips. The film was set in a futuristic Los Angeles, and Philips expected to use the film to showcase their emerging technology. Rees storyboarded various scenes in the film, but eventually several key players left the project, and it was shelved.

In 2010, Rees and voice actress/writer Deanna Oliver made an appearance at California State University, Northridge to discuss the making of their film The Brave Little Toaster.

Currently, Rees is a full-time creative consultant at the San Francisco film studio Wild Brain, where he is developing CGI Features. Rees is also attached to direct a Casey Silver Productions CGI feature.

Filmography

Feature films

Short films

Television

References

External links
 Official website
 
 

1956 births
20th-century American screenwriters
21st-century American screenwriters
Animators from Texas
Animal impersonators
American animated film directors
American animated film producers
Animation screenwriters
American male screenwriters
California Institute of the Arts alumni
Living people
People from Johnson County, Texas
Walt Disney Animation Studios people
Film directors from Texas
Screenwriters from Texas
20th-century American male writers
21st-century American male writers